Peavey Electronics Corporation is an American company that designs, develops, manufactures and markets professional audio equipment. One of the largest audio equipment manufacturers in the world, it is headquartered in Meridian, Mississippi.

History
Hartley Peavey founded Peavey Electronics in 1965, having built his first amplifier in 1957. Peavey Electronics is privately owned.

In 2011, Inc. magazine profiled the global success story of music and audio innovator Hartley Peavey and Peavey Electronics Corporation. "Hartley Peavey dreamed of becoming a rock star," wrote Inc.s Kasey Wehrum. "Though he lacked the chops to become the next Chuck Berry, his name has been etched into the pantheon of rock 'n' roll history."

Company information

Peavey currently owns  of manufacturing/assembly area over 33 facilities across North America, Europe and Asia, 18 of which are located in Mississippi. Products are manufactured mainly in China and the United States, and are distributed to 136 different countries. They hold 180 patents, and have a product range of around 2000 designs, with between 80 and 100 added each year.

In 2014, Peavey closed its UK distribution and manufacturing operations, citing that while the UK facility was originally a manufacturing plant, the lower cost and advanced techniques of Chinese manufacturing deemed it unsustainable.

That same year, Peavey closed its A Street plant in Meridian, Mississippi and laid off nearly 100 employees.

In 2019, Peavey laid off another 30 US based employees.

Peavey Electronics owns eight electronics brands: MediaMatrix, Architectural Acoustics, PVDJ, Crest Audio, Composite Acoustic, Sanctuary Series, Budda Amplification, and Trace Elliot.

Products

Although Peavey Electronics produces a wide variety of equipment, a few designs stand out through their popularity or use by prominent professionals.

5150, 6505, 6534+ series guitar amplifiers

These amplifiers (collectively the 5150 series) and speaker cabinets were the result of a collaboration with Eddie Van Halen. The 5150 series was preceded by the VTM-60/VTM-120 amps, among the first "non-hotrodded" amps. The 5150 has gained popularity with modern hard rock, hardcore punk and metal bands and guitarists due to its large amount of distortion. Jerry Cantrell of Alice in Chains uses this amplifier. While touring with Van Halen, Cantrell asked Eddie Van Halen, "if I could buy [one] off him at the end of the tour with them, and when I got home there were three full stacks and two guitars waiting for me." In 2004, Peavey and Eddie Van Halen parted ways, with Eddie taking the 5150 brand name with him. This resulted in the renaming of the amplifier as the 'Peavey 6505', with slightly updated styling but original circuitry. The 5150 II, which contains an extra preamp tube for more headroom and gain on the Rhythm channel, is the old equivalent to the new 6505+. In 2010, Peavey released a new amplifier for the 6505 line, the 6534+. It is much like the 6505+, but the 6534 has EL34 power tubes instead of the 6L6 power tubes on the standard 6505 amplifiers.

Bandit series guitar amplifiers
The Bandit amp series are solid-state combo guitar amplifiers. The Bandit amplifiers were introduced in 1980 and remain in production today (2020).

The earliest model Bandits had a power rating of 50 watts RMS into an 8 ohm speaker. The power rating has gradually increased over time, and current model Bandits are rated at 80 watts RMS into 8 ohms, and 100 watts RMS into 4 ohms. In the mid-1990s, the Bandit was used to introduce Peavey's proprietary TransTube circuitry, a solid-state technology aimed at emulating the sound of tube amplifiers.

Bandit models
 Bandit (1980)
 Solo Series Bandit (1981–1983)
 Solo Series Bandit 65 (1983–1986)
 Solo Series Bandit 75 (1987–1988)
 Solo Series Bandit 112 (1988–1995)
 TransTube Series Bandit 112 (1996–1999)
 TransTube Series 112, made in US (2000–2004)
 TransTube Series II Bandit 112, made in China (2004–2006)
 Peavey Bandit with Transtube Technology Made in China (2006–present)

Classic series guitar amplifiers

Peavey's line of guitar amplifiers made specifically for blues, jazz, and classic rock players. The original Classic series amplifiers were introduced in the 1970s (and were originally called the Peavey 'Vintage' series which the first releases used 6C10 tubes in the pre-amp, NOT solid State. 6C10 amps have a Presence knob, not a Master. Vintage Series changed to a solid state pre-amp & a Master Volume (which is the easy way to tell if the amp has 6C10 pre-amp or not without removing the back panel to access the chassis), the solid state preamps and 6L6GC power tubes. The Original 2–12 Vintage is 100 watts, whereas the 6–10 and the 1–15 are only 50 watts The original Classic was a 50 watt amp and two 12-inch speakers and a spring reverb, with two preamps for "clean" and "distortion" channels. They could be used separately, or by plugging the instrument into the "parallel" connection, which fed both preamps, allowing selection of one from the other using a foot switch. The instrument could also be plugged into the "series" connection, running first through the "clean" channel and feeding that into the "distortion" channel, providing a means of over driving the distortion preamp, creating a much more versatile method of producing distortion. The current line of Classic series amplifiers consist of three variations of the "Classic" model, the Classic 30 112, Classic 50 212 and 410. There are two variations of the "Delta Blues" model, the Delta Blues 115 and the Delta Blues 210. They use 12AX7 preamp tubes, EL84 power tubes, and have spring reverb tanks. From 1994 to 1997, a 15 watts amp with a 10 inches speaker was also produced: the Peavey Classic 20.

CS series power amplifiers
The CS series amplifiers (mainly the CS800) are some of the most used amplifiers in the world, and among Peavey's best selling products.

JSX series guitar amplifiers
The JSX series was designed for Joe Satriani. Satriani was looking for an amplifier that was customized to his style, had every feature he required, and would work in both live and studio applications. This amplifier was reissued as the Peavey XXX II when Joe Satriani's endorsement ended, since the original XXX platform was used as starting point for the design of the JSX series.

Radial Pro Series of drum kits
The Radial Pro Series were Peavey's high end drum line. In production from 1994 until 2002, it consisted of the RBS-1 prototypes, radial pro 1000, 750/751, and 500/501 models. The flagship 1000 model consisted of a radial bridge that took all the mounting stresses, and a 3-ply thin maple shell to enhance the resonance. The 750/751 series had composite bridges and stained 4-ply thin maple shells. The 500/501 series had composite bridges and wrapped 5-ply North American thin hickory shells.

Triple XXX/3120 series guitar amplifiers
The basis for the JSX series, the XXX series provides a tonal range from what some call "glassy" cleans, to "full body" hi-gain tones using its 3 channel interface.  The 3120 series came later but was the same amp as the first edition XXX. Originally, the Peavey XXX was set to become recording artist George Lynch's signature model but the deal never finalized.

ValveKing series guitar amplifiers
All-tube high gain amplifiers. Capable of anything from Blues to Metal.

Vypyr series guitar amplifiers
The Vypyr series of amps are modeling amplifiers. They generate different amplifier sounds based on digital models of various popular amplifiers. The models include Fender twin and deluxe, Mesa/Boogie Rectifier, Diezel Boutique, Krank Krankenstein, Vox AC30—and a large collection of Peavey amps like the 6505, XXX, and JSX.  In addition to these amp models, these amps feature 11 editable pre-amp effects (All But Vypyr 15), 11 editable rack effects, on-board looper (Vypyr 30, 60, 75, 100, 120), MIDI input (Vypyr 30, 60, 75, 100, 120), and USB 2.0 connectivity (Vypyr 60, 75, 100, 120). The battery powered "Nano Vypyr" was introduced in 2012 as a competitor against other small portable modeling amps like the Roland Micro Cube and Fender Mini-Mustang. The Vypyr 60 and Vypyr 120 amps as well as the Vypyr 120 head feature 12AX7 and 6L6GC tubes.  In 2013, an enhanced line of Vypyr amps was released. Called the "Vypyr VIP" series (short for "variable instrument input"), the VIP 1, VIP 2, and VIP 3 retain all the programmed models of the original Vypyrs, but also possess the ability to serve as acoustic guitar amps, as well as bass guitar amps. They are also programmable by way of computer software link.

TNT series bass amplifiers
The TNT Series bass amplifier first entered the market in the late 1970s as a 45-watt combo with one 15-inch speaker. The high-power TNT bass amplifier series was introduced as a 150–200 watt bass combo primarily equipped with a Scorpion or Black Widow 15-inch woofer. The TNT series was recently updated to 600 watts, under the title Peavey Tour TNT 115. It is currently the most powerful bass combo sold by Peavey.

400BH Series Bass Amplifiers
The 400 BH power amp module was used in a range of bass amps during the early 1980s, commencing with the MKIII Bass Head in 1979.

The MKIV Bass Amp head unit, introduced in 1981, offers a range of functions. It is air cooled, features protection circuitry, and is capable of around 300/350 watts RMS safely into 2 ohms. The 2 ohm load rating is very stable (this amp actually operates at less than 2 ohms), enabling the use of multiple mix and match speaker systems to improve acoustic efficiency and sound stage options. In contrast, typical modern musical instrument amps are usually limited to 4 ohms speaker systems. Circuit board layout is conservative, easy to access, repair or modify. Dynamics and reliability are excellent. Its only weak point is that the preamp and power amp modules are installed in the chipboard cabinet with lack of electromagnetic shielding, resulting in a need to physically separate the amp head from bass pickups and speakers.

Windsor series guitar amplifiers
Introduced as a low-cost clone of the vaunted Marshall JCM800 2203 Master Volume. The internal design is essentially identical to the vintage Marshall, with the exception of using a plate-fed tone stack instead of the Marshall-trademarked cathode-follower-based circuitry.

Wolfgang and HP2 series electric guitars

These were a result of a collaboration with Eddie Van Halen to produce his "ideal" guitar. The design was relatively successful, but did not gain the reputation or popularity of similarly priced guitars such as the Fender Stratocaster or the Gibson Les Paul. The Peavey Wolfgang was discontinued in 2004. Peavey re-introduced the Wolfgang as the HP2 during the 2017 Summer NAMM show.

The VT series was also popular in the late 1970s to early 1980s. Gary Rossington from Skynyrd played the Mace-VT. There was the Deuce-VT the Mace's little brother, and a Classic VT. The Mace and Deuce were the same amp but the Mace had six 6l6gc output tubes and the other only 4. Hence the Mace was 160 watts and the Deuce 120 watts

Controversy
In February 2015, the company was featured on an episode of the CBS television show, Undercover Boss. Chief Operating Officer Courtland Gray made visits to a company store and manufacturing plant in disguise, with the founder communicating to him through a hidden earpiece. Before the episode aired, the creator of Undercover Boss issued an unprecedented statement indicating something "unfortunate happened after filming". Peavey Electronics, citing global competitive pressures, partially closed down the same plant featured in the episode. The employees at the manufacturing plant featured in the episode felt betrayed by the move. The company said these moves were necessary to remain competitive against rivals who were already manufacturing in lower-cost locations.

Legal cases
In 2009, Peavey Electronics Corp. filed two lawsuits against various companies under Behringer/Music Group umbrella for patent infringement, federal and common law trademark infringement, false designation of origin, trademark dilution and unfair competition. 

In 2011, Music Group filed suit in the US District Court against Peavey Electronic Corp. for "false advertising, false patent marking and unfair competition". In making these allegations, the Music Group cites an ongoing investigation of its own initiation that has assessed Peavey products with regard to US patent laws and FCC regulations. 

In April 2014, Peavey Electronics Corporation was fined  (equivalent to $ in ) by the FCC for violating the digital device laws by not notating required labeling and marketing statements in their owner manuals.

References

External links

 Peavey Electronics Corp. Official website
Hartley Peavey NAMM Oral History Program Interview (2002)
UK President, Ken Achard NAMM Oral History Program Interview (2005)

Audio amplifier manufacturers
Guitar amplifier manufacturers
Guitar manufacturing companies
Loudspeaker manufacturers
Synthesizer manufacturing companies of the United States
Companies based in Mississippi
Musical instrument manufacturing companies of the United States
Electronics companies established in 1965
Manufacturing companies established in 1965
Meridian, Mississippi
Audio mixing console manufacturers
Audio equipment manufacturers of the United States